The Lower-Middle Cambrian animal Rhabdotubus is the earliest known pterobranch. It bears strong similarity to the graptolites - indeed for some time it was misclassified as a dendroid graptolite.

References

Cambrian invertebrates
Prehistoric hemichordate genera
Fossils of Sweden